Twelve Inch Mixes may refer to:
 The Twelve Inch Mixes, compilation album by Spandau Ballet
 A series of EPs marketed by Columbia Records in the 1980s/90s

See also
12-inch single